The World Weekly was an international online magazine created in November 2012. The founding editor was James Geary and the founding managing director Rory O'Grady. The magazine stopped publishing in June 2018.

Origins
Founded in November 2012, The World Weekly began publishing in January 2013 with 75,000 print copies being distributed at corporate venues, members' clubs and transport hubs around London. It was backed by Roland Rudd, Lord Mervyn Davies and Lord Jonathan Marland.

Much like other free newspapers, The World Weekly was handed out on the streets of London. Except its vendors wore yellow branded jackets and bowler hats. The plan was to distribute a freemium print edition first in London, before expanding to Hong Kong and New York City, with the aim of establishing a presence in 45 major cities.

Rory O'Grady described The World Weekly as an independent publication without any "specific political ideology" or "religious/non-religious view" with a "multidimensional" approach to news. Originally the magazine had rotating editors rather than one chief editor.

Content
The World Weekly started out in 2012 aiming at translating content from international news providers and "building a global network of stringers". It aimed to provide international news including non-Western points of view, with both free and premium services, targeting elite business, airlines and hotels.

Apart from The World Weekly'''s founding editor James Geary in 2012, the editor-in-chief in 2014 was Salman Shaheen. Shaheen described the journal's team as "very multicultural from all over the world" and aimed to "cut through the Western bias of big news organisations and get around entrenched political positions", and to "give readers the bigger picture".

In 2014, The Good Web Guide described The World Weekly as a "slick aggregator" that offered "original analysis". In 2015, its free service included retransmission of "leading" (according to Media Diversity Institute) media articles and content from think tanks and professional blogs.

In 2015, The World Weekly was briefly taken offline by Turkish hackers over its critical coverage of Recep Tayyip Erdogan. At the time, editor-in-chief Salman Shaheen said the magazine “will not be silenced or intimidated”.

Shaheen left in 2017. His successor Manuel Langendorf, later a European Council on Foreign Relations visiting fellow, was the magazine's editor-in-chief until it ceased publishing in June 2018. World Weekly Media Ltd was dissolved on October 15 2019.

EditorsThe World Weekly'' ceased publishing in 2018 after a six-year run. During those six years, the magazine had several editors:

 2012-2014: James Geary, Cathy Galvin, Peter Guest, Karen Bartlett
 2014-2017: Salman Shaheen
 2017-2018: Manuel Langendorf

References

External links
 

Publications established in 2012
British news websites
 Defunct magazines